Seven sharps may refer to:
C-sharp major, a major musical key with seven sharps
A-sharp minor, a minor musical key with seven sharps
Seven Sharp, a New Zealand current affairs show